Hawick Trades is a former rugby union club based in Hawick, in the Scottish Borders. They played in the Border League until 2004.

History

The club began in 1946. It was founded after the Second War by Hawick apprentices; based on a Combined Trades team that came together during the Second World War.

Association with Glynneath

From 1956, Hawick Trades have had a close association with the Welsh club Glynneath RFC. Since that date the clubs have played each other, one year at home; the next away.

Disbanding of the club

At the start of the 2004–05 season the Border League announced that Hawick Trades would be withdrawn from the league as their lack of players meant that their fixtures would be unfulfilled.

Since the club's demise, Hawick Trades now acts as a social club for former players.

Notable former players

British and Irish Lions

  Colin Deans

Scotland internationalists

Club Honours

 Cartha Sevens
 Champions (25): 1950, 1951, 1960, 1961, 1962, 1963, 1965, 1966, 1967, 1969, 1970, 1975, 1976, 1977, 1978, 1979, 1982, 1985, 1986, 1988, 1989, 1990, 1991, 1992, 1993
 Walkerburn Sevens
 Champions (3): 1950, 1969, 1985
 Gala Y.M. Sevens
 Champions: 1970
 Langholm Junior Sevens
 Champions: 1964, 1965, 1966, 1967, 1968, 1982, 1996
 Lasswade Sevens
 Champions: 1950, 1951, 1952, 1953, 1954, 1955, 1957
 Haddington Sevens
 Champions: 1949, 1952, 1954, 1968
 South of Scotland District Sevens
 Champions: 1950, 1973, 1976, 1985, 1990
 Kilmarnock Sevens
 Champions: 1958, 1959, 1964, 1968

References

Scottish rugby union teams
Rugby union clubs in the Scottish Borders
Hawick
Rugby clubs established in 1946
1946 establishments in Scotland
Rugby union clubs disestablished in 2004
Defunct Scottish rugby union clubs